For the 1979 Vuelta a España, the field consisted of 90 riders; 73 finished the race.

By rider

By nationality

References

1979 Vuelta a España
1979